Sustainable packaging is the development and use of packaging which results in improved sustainability. This involves increased use of life cycle inventory (LCI) and life cycle assessment (LCA) to help guide the use of packaging which reduces the environmental impact and ecological footprint.  It includes a look at the whole of the supply chain: from basic function, to marketing, and then through to end of life (LCA) and rebirth. Additionally, an eco-cost to value ratio can be useful
The goals are to improve the long term viability and quality of life for humans and the longevity of natural ecosystems. Sustainable packaging must meet the functional and economic needs of the present without compromising the ability of future generations to meet their own needs. Sustainability is not necessarily an end state but is a continuing process of improvement.

Sustainable packaging is a relatively new addition to the environmental considerations for packaging (see Packaging and labeling). It requires more analysis and documentation to look at the package design, choice of materials, processing, and life-cycle. This is not just the vague "green movement" that many businesses and companies have been trying to include over the past years.  Companies implementing eco-friendly actions are reducing their carbon footprint, using more recycled materials and  reusing more package components.  They often encourage suppliers, contract packagers, and distributors to do likewise.

Environmental marketing claims on packages need to be made (and read) with caution. Ambiguous greenwashing titles such as green packaging and  environmentally friendly can be confusing without specific definition. Some regulators, such as the US Federal Trade Commission, are providing guidance to packagers

Companies have long been reusing and recycling packaging when economically viable. Using minimal packaging has also been a common goal to help reduce costs. Recent years have accelerated these efforts based on social movements, consumer pressure, and regulation. All phases of packaging, distribution, and logistics are included.

Sustainable packaging is not focused on just recycling. Just as packaging is not the only eco target, although it is still top of mind for many. Right or wrong, the packaging is frequently scrutinized and used as the measure of a company's overall sustainability, even though it may contribute only a small percentage to the total eco-impact compared to other things, such as transportation, and water and energy use.

Environmental Impacts 
Impacts of packaging originate from three main stages including feedstock sourcing, production of polymers and packaging, and the end of life treatment of the packaging. Emissions from each stage contribute to climate change, air pollution, acidification,  and other environmental issues. Food waste is another prominent issue as one third of food meant for human consumption is lost. Sustainable packaging aims to address properties of food, for example chemical and microbiological properties, in order to limit packaging and food waste.

Criteria

The criteria for ranking and comparing packaging based on their sustainability is an active area of development.  General guidance, metrics, checklists, and scorecards are being published by several groups.

Government, standards organizations, consumers, retailers, and packagers are considering several types of criteria.

Each organization words the goals and targets a little differently. In general, the broad goals of sustainable packaging are:
 Functional – product protection, safety, regulatory compliance, etc.
 Cost effective – if it is too expensive, it is unlikely to be used
 Support long-term human and ecological health

Specific factors for sustainable design of packaging may include:
 Use of minimal materials –  reduced packaging, reduced layers of packaging, lower mass (product to packaging ratio), lower volume, etc.
 Energy efficiency, total energy content and usage, use of renewable energy, use of clean energy, etc. 
 Recycled content – as available and functional.  For food contact materials, there are special safety considerations, particularly for use of recycled plastics and paper.  Regulations are published by each country or region.
 Recyclability – recovery value, use of materials which are frequently and easily recycled, reduction of materials which hinder recyclability of major components, etc.
 Reusable packaging – repeated reuse of package, reuse for other purposes, etc.
 Use of renewable, biodegradable and compostable materials – when appropriate and do not cause contamination of the recycling stream
 Avoid the use of materials toxic to humans or the environment
 Effects on atmosphere/climate – ozone layer, greenhouse gases (carbon dioxide and methane), volatile organic compounds, etc.
 Water use, reuse, treatment, waste, etc.
 Worker impact: occupational health, safety, clean technology, etc.

The chosen criteria are often used best as a basis of comparison for two or more similar packaging designs; not as an absolute success or failure.  Such a multi-variable comparison is often presented as a radar chart (spider chart,  star chart, etc.).

Benefits
Some aspects of environmentally sound packaging are required by regulators while others are decisions made by individual packagers.  Investors, employees, management, and customers can influence corporate decisions and help set policies.  When investors seek to purchase stock, companies known for their positive environmental policy can be attractive.  Potential stockholders and investors see this as a solid decision: lower environmental risks lead to more capital at cheaper rates. Companies that highlight their environmental status to consumers can boost sales as well as product reputation. Going green  is often a sound investment that can pay off.

Alongside the environmental benefits of adopting sustainable packaging, eco-friendly packaging can increase sales, reduce packaging cost, and increase the image of a company's brand alongside the rising awareness spread regarding environmental impact. There has also been found a direct correlation between a company's implementation of sustainable packaging and a more sustainable supply chain management. Alternatives such as bio-based plastics that are abundant, low cost, and biodegradable, offer a possibility of reducing use of petroleum resources and carbon dioxide emissions.

Alternatives to conventional plastics

Plastic packages or plastic components are  sometimes part of a valid environmental solution. Other times, alternatives to petroleum and natural gas based plastic are desirable.
  
Materials have been developed or used for packaging without plastics, especially for use-cases in which packaging can't be phased-out – such as with policies for national grocery store requirements – for being needed for preserving food products or other purposes. 

A plant proteins-based biodegradable packaging alternative to plastic was developed based on research about spider silk which is known for its high strength and similar on the molecular level.

Researchers at the Agricultural Research Service are looking into using dairy-based films as an alternative to petroleum-based packaging.   Instead of being made of synthetic polymers, these dairy-based films would be composed of proteins such as casein and whey, which are found in milk.  The films would be biodegradable and offer better oxygen barriers than synthetic, chemical-based films.  More research must be done to improve the water barrier quality of the dairy-based film, but advances in sustainable packaging are actively being pursued.

Sustainable packaging policy cannot be individualized by a specific product. Effective legislation would need to include alternatives to many products, not just a select few; otherwise, the positive impacts of sustainable packing will not be as effective as they need in order to propel a significant reduction of plastic packaging. Finding alternatives can reduce greenhouse gas emissions from unsustainable packaging production and reduce dangerous chemical by-products of unsustainable packaging practices.

Another alternative to commonly used petroleum plastics are bio-based plastics. Examples of bio-based plastics include natural biopolymers and polymers synthesized from natural feedstock monomers, which can be extracted from plants, animals, or microorganisms. A polymer that is bio-based and used to make plastic materials is not necessarily compostable or bio-degradable. Natural biopolymers can be often biodegraded in the natural environment while only a few bio-based monomer bio-based plastics can be. Bio-based plastics are a more sustainable option in comparison to their petroleum based counterparts, yet they only account for 1% of plastics produced annually as of 2020.

Costs
The process of engineering more environmentally acceptable packages can include consideration of the costs.  Some companies claim that their environmental packaging program is cost effective. Some alternative materials that are recycled/recyclable and/or less damaging to the environment can lead to companies incurring increased costs. Though this is common when any product begins to carry the true cost of its production (producer pays, producer responsibility laws, take-back laws). There may be an expensive and lengthy process before the new forms of packaging are deemed safe to the public, and approval may take up to two years. It is important to note here, that for most of the developed world, tightening legislation, and changes in major retailer demand (Walmart's Sustainable Packaging Scorecard for example) the question is no longer "if" products and packaging should become more sustainable, but how-to and how-soon to do it.

ISO standards
The ISO's series of standards relating to packaging and the environment were published in 2013:
 ISO 18601:2013 Packaging and the environment - General requirements for the use of ISO standards in the field of packaging and the environment
 ISO 18602:2013 Packaging and the environment - Optimization of the packaging system
 ISO 18603:2013 Packaging and the environment - Reuse
 ISO 18604:2013 Packaging and the environment - Material recycling
 ISO 18605:2013 Packaging and the environment - Energy recovery
 ISO 18606:2013 Packaging and the environment - Organic recycling

Criticism

Efforts toward “greener” packaging are supported in the sustainability community; however, these are often viewed only as incremental steps and not as an end.  Some people foresee a true sustainable steady state economy that may be very different from today's:  greatly reduced energy usage, minimal ecological footprint,  fewer consumer packaged goods,  local purchasing   with short food supply chains, little processed foods, etc.
Less packaging would be needed in a sustainable  carbon neutral economy, which means that fewer packaging options would exist and simpler packaging forms may be necessary.

See also
 Biopolymer
 Cradle to cradle
 Design for the Environment
 Sustainability metric and indices
 Edible packaging
 Ecodesign
 Reusable shopping bag
 Sustainable Design
 Life Cycle Assessment

References

Further reading
 Azzato, Maureen, "Facilitating the Use of Recycled Content in Packaging"
 Jedlicka, W, "Packaging Sustainability: Tools, Systems and Strategies for Innovative Package Design", (Wiley, 2008), 
 Selke, S, "Packaging and the Environment", 1994, 
 Soroka, W, "Fundamentals of Packaging Technology", IoPP, 2002, 
 S.,Sterling, "Field Guide to Sustainable Packaging", 2008
 Stillwell, E. J, "Packaging for the Environment", A. D. Little, 1991, 
 Yam, K. L., "Encyclopedia of Packaging Technology", John Wiley & Sons, 2009, 
 Packaging Sustainability
 Packaging Systems and Design - Department of Sustainable Biomaterials
 The Centre for Sustainable Design
 Sustainable Packaging: Why Should We Care?
 ISO 18601-18606 Packaging and the Environment series of Standards
  Sustainable Packaging Summit, 2019

Brand management
Ecolabelling
Labels
Packaging
Product management
Packaging
Biodegradable materials
Waste minimisation